The Sony Xperia L2 is an Android smartphone manufactured by Sony Mobile Communications. It was announced and released in January 2018.

Specifications

Hardware 
The device features a  720p screen.

The rear-facing camera of the Xperia L2 is 13 megapixels. The front facing camera is 8MP.

Software 
The Xperia L2 is preinstalled with Android 7.1.1 Nougat with Sony's custom interface and software.

References

External links 

Android (operating system) devices
Sony smartphones